The 1859 Welsh revival was a Christian revival in Wales. It was led by two ministers: Humphrey Jones and David Morgan. The revival had its roots in the 1857–59 revival in the United States. Jones, a Methodist minister, had experienced the revival in New York. On his return to Tre'r Ddôl, he recruited Morgan, a Presbyterian, to the cause. It is estimated that the revival produced 100,000 converts.

Some writers, such as Martyn Lloyd-Jones, also view the revival as connected to the revival in Ulster during the same year.

References

Revival
Welsh revival
Christian revivals
History of Christianity in Wales